Ibrahim Ibn Saleh al-Hussaini  also known as Shaykh Sharif Saleh (born 12 May 1938) is a Nigerian Islamic scholar, teacher and mufassir. He is the grand Imam of the Federal Republic of Nigeria he established annahda college of science and Islamic studies in the year 1957 and he is currently the head of the Supreme Council for Fatwa and Islamic Affairs in Nigeria (NSCIA).

Early life 
Al-Hussaini was born on May 12, 1938, at a town called al-Fadhaa near Dikwa in Borno State, Nigeria. His father Shaykh Saleh was a religious scholar.

Education 
Al-Hussaini started his early childhood education at his father's madrasa one of the popular Islamic schools in Borno at that time, later he went to Saudi Arabia, Egypt and Pakistan to further his Islamic studies with interest in Hadith and Quranic sciences. Some of his teachers include; Shaykh Al-Qadi Abani Borno, Abubakar al-Waziri Borno, Shaykh Adam al-Mahrusa Borno, Ahmad AbdulFathi, Shaykh Tijjani Usman (Zangon Bare-bari), Shaykh Abubakar Atik, Muhammad al-Arabi bin Kubbani, Abubakar al-Kashnawiy, Muhammad al-Hafiz, Mahmoud Khalil Al-Hussary, Ahmad Nur al-Barni, Muhammad Hassanil Makhluf, Muhammad Zakariya al-Kandahlawiy, Ibrahim Nyass among others. Al-Hussaini has also studied English language in London.

Career 
Al-Hussaini is an international Islamic figure. Currently, he is the head of the Supreme Council for Fatwa and Islamic Affairs in Nigeria and he is a member of the Muslim Council of Elders . He completed his studies at the Supreme Islamic Institute in his country Nigeria  and then studied at the hands of well-known scholars in many countries. Al-Hussaini delivered many lectures in the fields of Al-Tafsir Qur’an and the Hadith as well as Islamic sciences, jurisprudence and ethics.

Positions
He has held and still holds several significant positions, some of which are:
 Chairman of Financial Regulation Advisory Council of Experts (FRACE) Central Bank of Nigeria
 Founder and mentor of the Islamic Renaissance Organization
Founding Member Association of Muslim Scholars in Africa (Morocco)
 Adviser to the Federal Government on Islamic Affairs 1992 
Assistant Secretary-General for African Affairs in the World Islamic People's Leadership 1989
 Chairman of Assembly of Muslims in Nigeria (AMIN)
 Member of the Muslim Council of Elders.
Founder of Sheikh Shariff Ibrahim Saleh Islamic Center (SHISIC)

Publications
Shaykh Ibn Saleh has written more than six hundred (600) books and pamphlets, as well as more than two hundred (200) commissioned conference papers, all in the Arabic language which include: Qur’anic sciences, Prophetic Traditions, History, Philosophy, Islamic studies etc.

Medals and awards
Shaykh has received a number of awards and certificates of appreciation on various occasions, including the following:
 Commander of the Order of the Niger (CON), presented to him by the President and Commander-in-Chief of the Armed Forces of the Federal Republic of Nigeria, Abuja, 2008.
 Doctorate Degree of Science (HNORIS COUSA) Conferred On him, at the 3RD Convocation Ceremony of the Nigerian Turkish Nile University, Abuja, On Saturday, 13TH June 2015.
 Order of the Republic in Science and Arts Arab Republic of Egypt 1993.
 Certificate of Merit from the National Union of Students of the State of Borno 1985.
 Certificate of Merit from the Students Union of the Faculty of Sharia and Law 1995.
 Certificate of Appreciation from the students of the Faculty of Law, University of Midogray 1995.
 Certificate of Appreciation from the Ambulance Department of Jama'atu Nasr Al-Islam Group 1996.

Legacies
 Mosque named after him; Shaykh Ibrahim Ibn Saleh Mosque Niger.

References

Living people
1938 births
Nigerian Sufi religious leaders
Grand Muftis
International Union of Muslim Scholars members
People from Borno State
Kanuri people